SMS  was the first battlecruiser built for the German Kaiserliche Marine, as well as Germany's first major turbine-powered warship. She was designed in response to the British . While the German design had slightly lighter guns—28 cm (11 in), compared to the 30.5 cm (12 in) Mark X mounted on the British ships— was faster and significantly better-armored. She set the precedent of German battlecruisers carrying much heavier armor than their British equivalents, albeit at the cost of smaller guns.

 participated in a number of fleet actions during the First World War, including several bombardments of the English coast. She was present at the Battle of Jutland, where she destroyed the British battlecruiser  in the opening minutes of the engagement.  was hit several times by large-caliber shells during the battle, and at one point in the engagement, the ship had all of her main battery guns out of action either due to damage or malfunction. Nevertheless, the damage was quickly repaired and the ship returned to the fleet in two months.

Following the end of the war in November 1918, along with most of the High Seas Fleet, was interned at Scapa Flow pending a decision by the Allies as to the fate of the fleet. The ship met her end in 1919 when German caretaker crews scuttled their ships to prevent their division among Allied navies. The wreck was raised in 1930, and scrapped at Rosyth from 1931 to 1934.

Development 

The preceding German large cruiser design of the 1906 budget year, was an incremental increase over previous armored cruisers.  was armed with twelve  guns, but the advent of the British , which were armed with a main battery of eight  guns, outclassed the latest armored cruiser in terms of firepower. As a result, the large cruiser for 1907 would need to be an entirely new design to counter the British ships. Among the preliminary designs were options that carried the secondary guns either in four twin-gun turrets or in casemates in a central battery. The Construction Office, under the Naval Constructor von Eickstedt, submitted a competing proposal for a ship with six 28 cm guns and a secondary battery of  guns.

Tirpitz had no intention of using the ship in the main battle line. Kaiser Wilhelm II however, along with most of the RMA, was in favor of incorporating the ship into the battle line after initial contact was made, which necessitated much heavier armor. The insistence upon the capability to fight in the battle line was a result of the numerical inferiority of the German High Seas fleet to the British Royal Navy. Initial proposals suggested a main battery of  guns, but financial limitations necessitated the use of smaller, less expensive weaponry. The same 28 cm twin-gun turrets that had been developed for the last two s would be used for "Cruiser F".

At a conference in September 1906, many of the disagreements over the ship's design were resolved. Eickstedt, argued that since the explosive trials for the proposed protection systems for the new battlecruiser had not been completed, the construction should be postponed to allow for any alterations to the design. He also argued that guns of 21 cm or  caliber would be sufficient to penetrate the armor of the new British battlecruisers. However, Admiral August von Heeringen, of the General Navy Department, stated that for the ship to be able to engage battleships, the 28 cm guns were necessary. Admiral Eduard von Capelle, the deputy director of the RMA, stated that depending on tests of the underwater protection system slated to be carried out in November, the main battery might have to be reduced in caliber to offset the weight of any improvements to the protection system that might need to be made. Tirpitz rejected the idea of a reduction in caliber, even if it required increasing displacement over the agreed-upon .

By the end of September, the design staff had submitted three basic arrangements to the Kaiser: "1a", with two twin turrets and four single turrets; "2a", with four twin turrets; and "5a", with three twin turrets and two single mounts. All three variants mounted their secondary guns in a casemate battery. The Kaiser approved "2a", which the design staff continued to refine, producing "2b" by moving the wing turrets to an en echelon arrangement that provided a theoretical broadside of all eight guns (though severe blast effects prevented this in practice).

On 22 June 1907, the Kaiser authorized construction of "Cruiser F", to be named , after Ludwig Freiherr von und zu der Tann-Rathsamhausen, a Bavarian general who fought in the Franco-Prussian War of 1870. The contract was awarded to the Blohm & Voss shipyard in Hamburg on 26 September 1907. The significant increases in price caused major problems for the German fleet, as the Naval Laws that governed the construction program assumed that prices would remain fairly stable over time.

Design

General characteristics 

Her draft measured  forward and  aft. Her hull was constructed with transverse and longitudinal steel frames and was divided into fifteen watertight compartments, with a double bottom that ran for 75 percent of the length of the hull.

The ship was a good sea boat with gentle motion, though she had a slight weather helm. She was difficult to control while steaming in reverse. With the rudder hard over, she lost up to sixty percent speed and heeled up to eight degrees. Frahm anti-roll tanks were fitted during construction, but these proved to be ineffective and they only reduced rolling by 33%. Bilge keels were later added to improve stability, and the space previously used for the anti-roll tanks was instead used as extra fuel storage. The ship was able to carry an additional 180 t (200 short tons) of coal in the anti-roll tanks.

The ship's crew compartments were arranged such that the officers were accommodated in the forecastle. This arrangement was found to be unsatisfactory, and not repeated in later classes.  was designed to be fitted with a lattice mast, but the ship was completed with standard pole masts instead. In 1914, spotting posts were attached to the masts in order to observe the fall of artillery fire.

Machinery 
 was the first large German warship to use steam turbines. Her propulsion system consisted of four steam turbines arranged in two sets: high pressure turbines, which ran the outer two shafts, and low pressure turbines, which powered the inner two shafts. The turbines were divided into three engine rooms. Steam for the turbines was provided by eighteen coal-fired double-ended water-tube boilers that were split into five boiler rooms. The boilers were ducted into two widely spaced funnels, one just aft of the fore mast and the other amidships.

At the time of her launch, she was the fastest dreadnought-type warship afloat.

Like many German capital ships,  had chronic problems with the often low-quality coal available for the ship's boilers. Following the end of the raid on Scarborough, s commander, Captain Max von Hahn, remarked that "the inadequacy of our coal and its burning properties results in heavy smoke clouds and signals our presence." During the battle of Jutland, the ship was unable to maintain fires in all of her boilers after 16:00, due to the poor quality coal. After 1916, the coal firing in the boilers was supplemented by spraying tar-oil on the coal, which improved the combustion rate.

Armament 

 carried eight  SK L/45 guns, mounted in four twin-gun turrets: one fore, one aft, and two staggered wing turrets. The guns were emplaced in the Drh.L C/1907 turntable mount, which was traversed electrically, while the guns themselves used hydraulics to change elevation. The guns could be elevated up to 20 degrees, which enabled a maximum range of 18,900 m (20,700 yd). A refit in 1915 increased this to 20,400 m (22,300 yd). The main guns fired a 302 kg (670 lb) armor-piercing shell that had a muzzle velocity of 875 m/s; the main propellant charges were encased in a brass cartridge. A total of 660 projectiles were stored in four shell rooms, each containing 165 shells. The wing turrets were staggered in such a way that all eight guns were able to fire on broadside on a very wide arc.

Unlike her British contemporaries,  also carried a heavy secondary battery, consisting of ten  SK L/45 guns, casemated in MPL C/06 pivot mounts, each with 150 high explosive and armor-piercing shells. At construction, these guns could fire their 45.3 kg (100 lb) shells at targets up to 13,500 m (14,800 yd) away; after the 1915 refit, their maximum range was extended to 16,800 m (18,400 yd). She was also armed with sixteen  SK L/45 guns, to defend against torpedo boats and destroyers. These were also emplaced in pivot mounts, of the MPL C/01-06 type, with a total of 3,200 shells for these guns. These guns fired a 9 kg (20 lb) shell at the high rate of 15 rounds per minute, up to a range of 10,694 m (11,695 yd), which was quite long for a smaller caliber weapon. In late 1916, following repair work after the damage sustained during the Battle of Jutland,  had her 8.8 cm (3.5 in) guns removed and the firing ports welded shut. Two 8.8 cm flak guns were installed on the aft superstructure.

As was customary for capital ships of the time,  was equipped with four  torpedo tubes, with a total of eleven torpedoes. These were located in the bow, the stern, and two on the broadside. The torpedoes carried a 110 kg (240 lb) warhead, and had an effective range of 2 km (1.04 nmi) when set for a speed of 32 kn (59 km/h), and 1.5 km (0.81 nmi) at 36 kn (67 km/h).

Armor 

s armor consisted of Krupp cemented and nickel steel. The main belt armor was 80–120 mm  (3.1–4.7 in) thick forward, 250 mm (9.8 in) thick over the ship's citadel, and was 100 mm (3.9 in) thick aft. The forward conning tower was protected by 250 mm (9.8 in), while the aft conning tower by 200 mm (7.9 in). The four turrets had 230 mm (9.1 in) faces, 180 mm (7.1 in) sides, and 90 mm (3.5 in) on the roofs. The horizontal armor measured 25 mm (0.98 in) thick, and the sloping deck armor was 50 mm (2 in) thick. Like the armored cruiser  before her, she was protected by a torpedo bulkhead, 25 mm (0.98 in) thick. It was set back a distance of 4 meters (13 ft) from the outer hull skin, the space in between being used to store coal.

Service history 

General Luitpold Freiherr von und zu der Tann-Rathsamhausen, a nephew of the ship's namesake and then the commander of III Royal Bavarian Corps, christened the ship at the launching ceremony. The German Navy was chronically short of crews at the time, so dockyard workers had to bring the ship to Kiel. On 1 September 1910, the ship was commissioned into the German Navy, with a crew composed largely of men from the dreadnought .

 was sent to South America after completing her trials, departing Germany on 20 February 1911. She stopped in the Canary Islands on the way. She visited Rio de Janeiro, Brazil, arriving there on 14 March, where she was visited by the Brazilian president, Hermes da Fonseca, before continuing on to Itajaha on 23 March. During this period, she cruised with the German light cruiser , which was in the area. From there, she continued to Bahía Blanca, Argentina on 27 March, where many of her crew went ashore to visit the city. She stayed there until 8 April when she left for Bahia, Brazil, which she reached six days later. From there, Mischke and his staff made a visit to Buenos Aires on 30 March. On 17 April, she departed for home, arriving back in Wilhelmshaven on 6 May. The primary purpose of the cruise was to obtain armament contracts from South American countries by impressing them with what was "widely advertised as the fastest and most powerful warship then afloat." 

Two days after arriving in port,  joined I Scouting Group. In June, she steamed to Vlissingen in the Netherlands, where she embarked Crown Prince Wilhelm and his wife Cecilie to take them to attend the coronation of King George V of the United Kingdom. The ceremonies included a Fleet Review at Spithead that lasted from 20 to 29 June, where  represented Germany. The battlecruiser then carried the Crown Prince and Princess back to Germany. She returned to operations with the fleet in August, and on 29 September, she became the flagship of I Scouting Group, replacing  in that role. In July 1912, while  was undergoing an engine overhaul, the new battlecruiser  replaced  as flagship. KzS Max Hahn replaced Mischke as the ship's captain in September. She briefly served as the flagship of the deputy commander,  (Rear Admiral) Franz von Hipper, from 21 to 26 September.

First World War

1914
Following the outbreak of the First World War in July 1914, s first major sortie occurred when the ship took part in the unsuccessful search for British battlecruisers, after the Battle of Heligoland Bight, in August 1914. During the action,  had been stationed in Wilhelmshaven Roads, and had been ordered to raise steam as early as 08:20, to assist the German cruisers under attack in the Heligoland Bight.

 was ready to sail by 10:15, more than an hour before the British battlecruisers arrived on the scene. However, the ship was held up by low tide, which prevented the battlecruisers from crossing the bar at the mouth of the Jade Estuary. By 16:00, the German flotilla began returning to the Jade Estuary, arriving at approximately 20:23.

Later that year  was present at the Raid on Yarmouth, on 2–3 November. At 18:00, two dreadnought battle squadrons of the High Seas Fleet departed to provide support. Hipper's force veered north in an arc to avoid Heligoland and the British submarines stationed there, and then increased speed to 18 knots. At approximately 06:30 the following morning, Hipper's battlecruisers spotted the British minesweeper  and opened fire, which drew the attention of the destroyer . Hipper realized that he was wasting time, and that further pursuit would run his ships into a known minefield, so he ordered his ships back to sea. As the flotilla was turning away, the battlecruisers fired several salvos at Great Yarmouth, to little effect. By the time the British Admiralty was fully aware of the situation, the German force had retreated back to home waters.

 also participated in the raid on Scarborough, Hartlepool and Whitby, on 15–16 December. Hipper's ships sailed north, through the channels in the minefields, past Heligoland to the Horns Reef light vessel, at which point the ships turned westward, towards the English coast. The main battle squadrons of the High Seas Fleet left in the late afternoon of the 15th. During the night of 15 December, the main body of the High Seas Fleet encountered British destroyers, and fearing the prospect of a night-time torpedo attack, Admiral Ingenohl ordered the ships to retreat.

Upon nearing the British coast, Hipper's battlecruisers split into two groups. The two ships destroyed the coast guard stations in both towns, along with the signalling station in Whitby. By 09:45 on the 16th, the two groups had reassembled, and began to retreat eastward. Hipper was unaware of Ingenohl's withdrawal, and following the bombardment of the target cities, turned back to rendezvous with the German fleet. By this time, David Beatty's battlecruisers were in position to block Hipper's chosen egress route, while other forces were en route to complete the encirclement. At 12:25, the light cruisers of II Scouting Group began to pass the British forces searching for Hipper. One of the cruisers in the 2nd Light Cruiser Squadron spotted , and signaled a report to Beatty. At 12:30, Beatty turned his battlecruisers towards the German ships. Beatty presumed that the German cruisers were the advance screen for Hipper's ships, however, those were some 50 km (31 mi) ahead. The 2nd Light Cruiser Squadron, which had been screening for Beatty's ships, detached to pursue the German cruisers, but a misinterpreted signal from the British battlecruisers sent them back to their screening positions. This confusion allowed the German light cruisers to escape, and alerted Hipper to the location of the British battlecruisers. The German battlecruisers wheeled to the northeast of the British forces and made good their escape.

1915–1916

 was being refitted at the time of the Battle of Dogger Bank, and so she missed this action. She was replaced by the armored cruiser , which was sunk during the battle. In 1915 the ship took part in operations in the North and Baltic Seas. On 3–4 February 1916,  participated in the fleet advance to welcome home the commerce raider . That month, KzS Hans Zenker replaced Hahn as s commander. The ship was also present during the fleet sorties of 5–7 March, 17 April, 21–22 April, and 5 May.

 also took part in the bombardment of Yarmouth and Lowestoft on 24–25 April. Hipper was away on sick leave, so the German ships were under the command of Konteradmiral Friedrich Boedicker. The heavy units of the High Seas Fleet sailed at 13:40, with the objective to provide distant support for Boedicker's ships. The British Admiralty was made aware of the German sortie through the interception of German wireless signals, and deployed the Grand Fleet at 15:50.

By 14:00, Boedicker's ships had reached a position off Norderney, at which point he turned his ships northward to avoid the Dutch observers on the island of Terschelling. At 15:38,  struck a mine, which tore a 50-ft (15-m) hole in her hull, just abaft of the starboard broadside torpedo tube, which allowed 1,400-t (1,500-short tons) of water to enter the ship.  turned back, with the screen of light cruisers, at a speed of 15 knots. The four remaining battlecruisers turned south immediately in the direction of Norderney to avoid further mine damage. By 16:00,  was clear of imminent danger, so the ship stopped to allow Boedicker to disembark.

Boedicker refused to be distracted by the British ships, and instead trained his ships' guns on Lowestoft. The two 6 in (15 cm) shore batteries were destroyed, along with other damage to the town. Zenker later wrote:

At 05:20, the German raiders turned north, towards Yarmouth, which they reached by 05:42. The German ships turned back south, and at 05:47, encountered for the second time the Harwich Force, which had by then been engaged by the six light cruisers of the screening force. Boedicker's ships opened fire from a range of 13,000 yd (12,000 m). Tyrwhitt immediately turned his ships around and fled south, but not before the cruiser  sustained severe damage. Due to reports of British submarines and torpedo attacks, Boedicker broke off the chase, and turned back east towards the High Seas Fleet. At this point, Scheer, who had been warned of the Grand Fleet's sortie from Scapa Flow, turned back towards Germany.

Battle of Jutland 

 participated in the Battle of Jutland, as part of Hipper's First Scouting Group.  was the rearmost of five battlecruisers in Hipper's line. Shortly before 16:00 CET, on 31 May 1916, Hipper's force encountered Beatty's battlecruiser squadron. The German ships were the first to open fire, at a range of approximately 15,000 yd (14,000 m). Fourteen minutes of firing later,  had scored five hits on Indefatigable out of 52 heavy shells fired, one of which caused Indefatigable to explode and sink. Both appeared to explode on impact. After an interval of thirty seconds, the ship blew up. Sheets of flame were followed by dense smoke which obscured her from view."

The German battlecruisers began zig-zagging to avoid the gunfire from the British ships. At 17:09, six minutes after sinking Indefatigable,  was hit by one 15 in (38 cm) shell from Barham, which struck beneath the waterline and dislodged a section of the belt armor, causing  to take in 600 tons of water. This hit temporarily damaged the ship's steering gear, and combined with s zig-zagging cause her to fall out of line to port. The German Official History commented that "the greatest calamity of a complete breakdown of the steering gear was averted, otherwise,  would have been delivered into the hands of the oncoming battleships as in the case of  during the Dogger Bank action."

At 17:20, a 13.5 in (34 cm) shell from the battlecruiser  struck the barbette of s A turret. A chunk of armor plate was dislodged from inside the turret, and struck the turret training gear, which jammed the turret at 120 degrees. This put the turret out of action for the duration of the engagement. At 17:23, the ship was hit again by a 13.5 in (34 cm) shell from Tiger, which struck near the C turret and killed 6 men. The shell holed the deck and created enough wreckage that the turret was unable to traverse, and the starboard rudder engine room was damaged. The C turret was out of action until the wreckage could be cut away. Smoke from a fire caused by burning practice targets that had been stowed below the turret obscured the ship. Sections of the torpedo nets were knocked loose and trailed behind the ship. However, they were cut loose before they could catch in the propellers. Shortly thereafter, at 17:23,  registered a hit on Barham. However, after firing only 24 shells,  had to return to her earlier target, New Zealand, because her fore and aft turrets had since been disabled, and her amidships turrets were no longer able to target Barham.

At 18:15, the guns of the last active turret jammed in their mountings, leaving  without any working main armament. Regardless, she remained in the battle line to distract the British gunners. Because she was no longer firing her main guns,  was able to maneuver in an erratic manner, such that she could avoid British gunfire. By 18:53, the ship's speed fell from 26 kn (48 km/h) to 23 kn (43 km/h). Over an hour and a half after having failed due to mechanical difficulties, D turret was repaired and again ready for action.  sustained her fourth and final heavy shell hit at 20:19, when one 15 in (38 cm) shell from  struck the aft conning tower. Shell splinters penetrated the conning tower, killing the Third Gunnery Officer and both rangefinder operators and wounding every other crewman in the tower. Shell fragments and other debris fell through the ventilating shaft and onto the condenser, which put out all the lights in the ship. Eleven minutes later, at 20:30, B turret was again clear for action, and by 21:00, C turret was also in working order. However, both of the amidships turrets suffered further mechanical difficulties that put them out of action later during the battle.

At 03:37, the British destroyer Moresby fired a torpedo at the rear of the German line; this passed closely across s bow, and forced the ship to turn sharply to starboard to avoid being hit. Close to the end of the battle, at 03:55, Hipper transmitted a report to Admiral Scheer, informing him of the tremendous damage his ships had suffered. Hipper reported: "I Scouting Group was therefore no longer of any value for a serious engagement, and was consequently directed to return to harbor by the Commander-in-Chief, while he himself determined to await developments off Horns Reef with the battlefleet."

During the course of the battle, two of s main turrets were knocked out by British gunfire, while her other two turrets suffered mechanical failures. The ship was firing so fast that several of the main guns in the amidships turrets became overheated and jammed in their recoil slides, and could not be returned to working order.  was without her main battery for 11 hours, although three turrets were restored to working order before the end of the battle; D turret only after much cutting away of bent metal with oxyacetylene torches—afterwards the guns could be worked only by hand. Her casualties amounted to 11 dead and 35 wounded. During the battle  fired 170 heavy shells and 98 secondary caliber shells.

Later actions 
After Jutland, she underwent repairs from 2 June until 29 July. After returning to the fleet,  took part in several unsuccessful raids into the North Sea in 1916. I Scouting Group was to bombard the coastal town of Sunderland, in an attempt to draw out and destroy Beatty's battlecruisers. Admiral Scheer and the rest of the High Seas Fleet, with fifteen dreadnoughts of its own, would trail behind, providing cover. The British were aware of the German plans, and sortied the Grand Fleet to meet them. By 14:35, Scheer had been warned of the Grand Fleet's approach and, unwilling to engage the whole of the Grand Fleet just eleven weeks after the decidedly close call at Jutland, turned his forces around and retreated to German ports.

Further sorties were conducted on 25–26 September, 18–19 October, 23–24 October, as well as the advance on 23–24 March 1917; none of these resulted in action with British forces. KzS Konrad Mommsen relieved Zenker in April.  served as the flagship of Rear Admiral Ludwig von Reuter during the fleet advance to Norway on 23–25 April 1918, as well as in the sortie on 8–9 July.

Fate 

 was to have taken part in a final fleet action at the end of October 1918, days before the Armistice was to take effect. The bulk of the High Seas Fleet was to have sortied from their base in Wilhelmshaven to engage the British Grand Fleet; Scheer—by now the Grand Admiral of the fleet—intended to inflict as much damage as possible on the British navy, in order to retain a better bargaining position for Germany, despite the expected casualties. However, many of the war-weary sailors felt the operation would disrupt the peace process and prolong the war. While the High Seas Fleet was consolidating in Wilhelmshaven, sailors began deserting en masse. As  and  passed through the locks that separated Wilhelmshaven's inner harbor and roadstead, some 300 men from both ships climbed over the side and disappeared ashore. On the morning of 29 October 1918, the order was given to sail from Wilhelmshaven the following day. The unrest ultimately forced Hipper and Scheer to cancel the operation. Informed of the situation, the Kaiser stated "I no longer have a navy."

Following the capitulation of Germany in November 1918, most of the High Seas Fleet, under Reuter's command, were interned in the British naval base in Scapa Flow. Prior to the departure of the German fleet, Admiral Adolf von Trotha made clear to von Reuter that he could not allow the Allies to seize the ships, under any conditions. The fleet rendezvoused with the British light cruiser , which led the ships to the Allied fleet that was to escort the Germans to Scapa Flow. The massive flotilla consisted of some 370 British, American, and French warships. Once the ships were interned, their guns were disabled through the removal of their breech blocks, and their crews were reduced to 200 officers and enlisted men.  was interned at Scapa Flow under the command of  Wollante. While in Scapa Flow, a soldiers' council was formed aboard the ship; the council took complete, dictatorial control of the vessel for the duration of the interment.

The fleet remained in captivity during the negotiations that ultimately produced the Treaty of Versailles. Von Reuter believed that the British intended to seize the German ships on 21 June 1919, which was the deadline for Germany to have signed the peace treaty. Unaware that the deadline had been extended to the 23rd, Reuter ordered the ships to be sunk at the next opportunity. On the morning of 21 June, the British fleet left Scapa Flow to conduct training maneuvers, and at 11:20 Reuter transmitted the order to his ships. The ship sank in two hours and fifteen minutes. The task of raising  was secured by Ernest Cox's salvage company. During preparation work, three workers were nearly killed when their oxy-acetylene cutters set off a major explosion. The blast tore holes in the still submerged vessel and allowed water into the compartment that had been emptied with compressed air; by the time the men were rescued, the compartment had refilled almost completely and the men were up to their necks. Nevertheless, the ship was successfully brought up on 7 December 1930, and scrapped at Rosyth by the Alloa Shipbreaking Company beginning in 1931.

Footnotes

Notes

Citations

References

Further reading
 
 
 
 

Battlecruisers of the Imperial German Navy
Ships built in Hamburg
1909 ships
World War I battlecruisers of Germany
World War I warships scuttled at Scapa Flow
Maritime incidents in 1919